Handforth is a town and civil parish in Cheshire, England,  south of Manchester city centre. The population at the 2011 census was 6,266. In the 1960s and 1970s, two overspill housing estates, Spath Lane in Handforth, and Colshaw Farm nearby in Wilmslow, were built to re-house people from inner city Manchester. It lies between Wilmslow, Heald Green, Stanley Green and Styal and forms part of the Greater Manchester Built-up Area.

History

Handforth's original name was Handforth-cum-Bosden, having resided in the parish of Cheadle in some of its earliest mentions. The name "Handforth" is believed to originate from the Saxon name for a crossing on the River Dean, "Hanna's Ford". The first mention of Handforth is found in a charter dated between 1233 and 1236 CE, with a later mention found in a deed of transfer between Lord Edmund Phitoun and Henry de Honeford, dated to 1291. The settlement is not mentioned in the Domesday Book of 1086, though it may have, at that time, been recorded as a component part of the parish of Cheadle.

During the Crusades, Handforth acquired its own Coat of Arms, displaying the Honford Star emblem of Henry de Honeford, a member of the local nobility. The town was referred to as "Honford" in John Speede's map of the area in 1611, also named after the de Honford family.

The oldest building in Handforth is Handforth Hall, a typical Tudor-styled black and white timber building built by Sir Urian Brereton in 1562, also originally named "Honford Hall" after the de Honfords. Sir Urian Brereton, the escheator of Cheshire and one of the privy grooms to King Henry VIII, died at Handforth Hall on 19 March 1577, and is thought to be buried in one of the chapels of St Mary's Church, Cheadle. In the church's south chapel, two recumbent effigies depicted in alabaster are thought to represent members of the Hondford family; Sir John, who died in 1461, and his son, also named John. A third, depicted in sandstone, represents Sir Thomas Brereton, who died in 1673.  The most famous resident of Handforth is Sir Urian's great grandson, the Parliamentary General Sir William Brereton, 1st Baronet, who fought in the English Civil War.

During the First World War, an internment camp was set up in Handforth, for both civilian and military prisoners. The site, converted from a disused print works built in 1910 and requisitioned by the War Office in 1914, was designed to hold no more than 3,000 men, and was opened on 6 November 1914 with the arrival of 500 prisoners. From May 1915, following the aftermath of a number of Anti-German riots which swept a number of cities in England, the camp's civilian population increased, following decisions to intern 'enemy aliens', with a number of men sent to Handforth from Liverpool. The camp was inspected by an attaché to the American Embassy in London on 1 April 1916, at which a time there were 2,713 prisoners living in the camp.

At the height of the camp's operations, the interned population of the camp was greater than that of the village of Handforth itself; later in the war, when German soldiers captured from the front lines began to arrive, the local population started to take a greater interest in the camp, and would watch the new arrivals, with crowds gathering at the nearby railway station. The Manchester Evening News reported on 17 March 1915: "Great excitement prevailed at Handforth and Wilmslow today when it became generally known that about 600 German prisoners taken during heavy fighting in the North of France were expected to arrive for internment at the concentration camp."

During the Second World War, Handforth, along with Cheadle Hulme, became home to large parts of RAF Handforth, a maintenance unit classed as a universal stores depot, with the official Royal Air Force name 'RAF Handforth No 61 M.U. (Maintenance unit)'. The depot, which covered large areas of land in both Handforth and neighbouring Cheadle Hulme, opened in 1939 and closed in 1959. The depot's stores spanned every single item required by the RAF in wartime, from utensils and everyday tools to aircraft engines. The site was served by a large, internal railway system, which left the Manchester to Crewe mainline near Handforth railway station; the site of the exchange sidings and junction is now found on the modern-day Epsom Avenue. The depot also featured its own shunting locomotives, which were stored in an engine shed that stood at the Wilmslow bound exit slip road for the Handforth Dean shopping centre. The only surviving buildings of RAF Handforth are the government pay offices, now found on Dairyhouse Lane; these buildings, used as the headquarters of the depot, have survived in Ministry of Defence use to this day.

In January 2017, government plans were announced to build a garden village on the eastern margin of Handforth village, to include 2,000 houses with facilities including a nursery and care home.

Administrative history
Handforth-cum-Bosden was part of the Stockport Registration District between 1837 and 1877, until it was divided onto the separate parishes of Handforth and Bosden. Handforth continued to be part of the Stockport Registration District from 1877 to 1936, when it was then incorporated into the parishes of Wilmslow and Cheadle and Gatley. The parish of Bosden was abolished in 1900, and incorporated into the parish of Hazel Grove and Bramhall.

Handforth, along with other towns such as Whitworth, Poynton and Alderley Edge, successfully objected to being part of the metropolitan county of Greater Manchester when it was formed in 1974, as a result of plans laid out in the Local Government Act 1972. From 1974 until the changes in local government, which occurred in 2009, Handforth was administered by both the Macclesfield Borough Council and the Cheshire County Council. On 1 April 2009, it became part of the Cheshire East unitary authority.

Geography
Handforth borders Heald Green to the north and Wilmslow to the south, between the Cheshire Plain and the Pennines. The area lies near the River Dean, a tributary of the River Bollin that flows north–west and eventually joins the River Mersey near Lymm. The local geology is mostly glacial clay, as well as glacial sands and gravel.

The majority of buildings in the area are houses dating to the 20th and 21st centuries, with a small number of buildings - such as that of Handforth Hall - dating to before this time.

Climate 
Handforth experiences a temperate maritime climate, like much of the British Isles, with relatively cool summers and mild winters.

Physical geography

The eastern half of Cheshire, in which Handforth is located, is Upper Triassic Mercia Mudstone laid down with large salt deposits, which were mined for hundreds of years around Northwich. Separating this area from Lower Triassic Sherwood Sandstone to the west is a prominent sandstone ridge known as the Mid Cheshire Ridge. A  footpath, the Sandstone Trail, follows this ridge from Frodsham to Whitchurch, passing Delamere Forest, Beeston Castle and earlier Iron Age forts.

Before county boundary alterations in 1974, the county top was Black Hill near Crowden, in the far east of the historic county on the border with the West Riding of Yorkshire. Black Hill is now the highest point in West Yorkshire.

Governance
Handforth is in Cheshire East, a unitary authority area with borough status in the county of Cheshire, and the constituency of Tatton, a strongly Conservative seat represented by Esther McVey. It is the third most affluent constituency in the UK outside of Kensington and Cities of London and Westminster. Before Brexit in 2020, it was also represented in the European Parliament as part of the North West England constituency.

Handforth Parish Council was formed in May 2011; it consists of seven councillors, representing three wards. The parish council gained attention in February 2021, after a heated Zoom meeting of its Planning and Environment Committee went viral. This event spawned a number of memes and mainstream media coverage. After gaining online traction on the evening of 4 February, attendee Jackie Weaver's name was the highest trending topic on Twitter in the United Kingdom that night and the following day.

In August 2021 the parish Council declared Handforth as a town and the council changed its name to Handforth Town Council Stating two reasons 1) to differentiate the parish council from that of the local Parochial Church Council  that administer the affairs of the Church of England's mission and ministry in the town. And; 2) because ""The distinction between a 'village' and a 'town' is based on settlement form rather than population size. Where property forms part of a village, there need only be another 35 dwellings within 800 metres to justify using the name "Village". Where a dwelling forms part of a town there must be at least 500 other dwellings within 800 metres to justify using the name "Town". There were approximately 3100 dwellings and a population of 6266 at the 2011 census"

Demography

Population
The historic population of Handforth was 650 in 1851, and 911 in 1901. According to the United Kingdom Census 2011, the Handforth Ward has a population of 9,139 people. This is an increase from the data in the 2001 Census, when the Handforth Ward had a population of 8,014 people. The gender composition of Handforth is made up of 50.8% (4,640) females and 49.2% (4,499) males.

Ethnicity
According to the 2011 Census, ethnic white groups (British, Irish, other) account for 91.6% (8,375) of the population, against 96.8% in the previous 2001 census, with 8.4% (764 people) being in ethnic groups other than white.

Of the 8.4% (764 people) in non-white ethnic groups:

21.6% (165) belonged to mixed ethnic groups
56.4% (431) were Asian or Asian British
11.9% (91) belonged to other ethnic groups
10.1% (77) were Black or Black British

Religion
According to the 2011 Census, a breakdown of the religious groups and denominations in Handforth showed a majority (79.2% in 2001, 63.5% in 2011) Christian population, with the second-largest recorded group being people with no religion (12.8% in 2001, rising to 24.5% in 2011), followed by Handforth's Muslim population (1% in 2001, rising to 2.7% in 2011):

Christian - 79.2% (6,345 people), 2001; 63.5% (5,805 people), 2011
No religion - 12.8% (1,026 people), 2001; 24.5% (2,244 people), 2011
Religion not stated - 5.9% (473 people), 2001; 6.8% (621 people), 2011
Muslim - 1% (82 people), 2001; 2.7% (250 people), 2011
Hindu - 0.4% (31 people), 2001; 0.9% (78 people), 2011
Jewish - 0.3% (27 people), 2001; 0.4% (36 people), 2011
Buddhist - 0.2% (12 people), 2001; 0.3% (28 people), 2011
Sikh - 0.1% (8 people), 2001; 0.5% (43 people), 2011
Other religions - 0.1% (10 people), 2001; 0.4% (34 people), 2011

Places of worship

There are three churches in Handforth:

Methodist
St Mary's Methodist Church was built in 1872, though Methodism was present in the Handforth and Wilmslow area long before this. It is recorded that John Wesley preached at nearby Finney Green on 1 September 1748.
Roman Catholic
St Benedict's Roman Catholic Church is part of the Diocese of Shrewsbury, and was officially opened by the Bishop of Shrewsbury on 29 November 1968. The church is noted for its connection to Ambrose Barlow, an English Benedictine monk whose mother was born at Handforth Hall.
Anglican
St Chad's Church of England, part of the Diocese of Chester, is an Anglican church based in Handforth. During the 19th century, a chapel of ease was built in Handforth, then part of the parish of Cheadle. The chapel was consecrated in 1837 as a chapel to St Mary's Church, Cheadle, becoming the parish church for Handforth and part of Cheadle in 1877. Due to the growth of the population of Handforth in the late 19th century, the chapel went through extensive redevelopment and expansion, and the new building - known as St Chad's Church - was consecrated by Francis Jayne, Bishop of Chester on St Chad's day, 2 March, in 1899.

Transport
Handforth railway station is situated on the Crewe to Manchester line, a spur off the West Coast Main Line. Regular services are operated by Northern Trains between Manchester Piccadilly and Crewe, via Levenshulme, Stockport, Cheadle Hulme and Wilmslow.

The A34 by-pass is situated to the east  and the main thoroughfare is Wilmslow Road (B5358).

Manchester Airport lies just  to the north-west, though Handforth lies away from the airport's approach and departure routes; it therefore suffers only slightly from aircraft noise.

Bus 42C, operated by Stagecoach Manchester, runs between Handforth Dean and Manchester city centre, via Cheadle and East Didsbury.

Economy
Handforth Dean is a retail park that houses shops such as Tesco, Marks & Spencer Outfit and Boots the Chemist, and is situated by the A34 bypass. Pets at Home has its headquarters in Handforth.

Public services

Health
Handforth Health Centre, purpose-built in 1975, was purchased from the Health Authority by the GPs in 1992 and completely refurbished.

Schools

Handforth is served by three primary schools: Handforth Grange (formerly Wilmslow Grange, 1951–2019), Dean Oaks Primary and St Benedict's RC Primary.

Police
Handforth is served by Cheshire Constabulary, with the closest branch being based in Wilmslow.

Fire
Cheshire Fire and Rescue Service is the fire service that caters for Handforth, with the nearest fire station being located in Wilmslow.

Sport 
Handforth Hall Tennis Club, founded in 1850, has three hard courts. The Men's team competes in Division 9 of the Slazenger North East Cheshire Lawn Tennis League, whilst the Ladies' team competes in Division 7. The club also features tennis coaching, and the small pavilion hosts table tennis, carpet bowling and auction bridge.

Notable people 

Creative arts
 Dr Lucy Harrison (1989-) Composer and sound designer specialising in interactive sound and music

Facilities

Parks
Until the mid-1980s, the park was the site for the Handforth Gala. Current attractions in the park include a multi-sport court, tennis courts and a miniature railway, which is operated by the Handforth Model Engineering Society.

Stanley Hall Park is situated between the Spath Lane Estate and the railway line from Handforth to Cheadle Hulme. The park was donated by Manchester City Council in the early 1960s. The park is owned and maintained by Cheshire East Council's environmental partner Ansa, and has an active 'friends of the park' group. Facilities include the Swingtime play areas and Multi-Use Games Area donated by Spath Lane Residents Association, and a 52-seat all-inclusive picnic area with space for 15 wheelchairs or buggies and a concrete skatepark installed by the Friends of Stanley Hall Park in 2015–16.

Notes

References

External links

 Handforth Town Council
 Handforth Model Engineering Society
 Saint Benedict's Roman Catholic Church
 Saint Chad's Parish Church of England
 Handforth

Towns in Cheshire